Off the Block with Ross and Marissa (often shortened to just Off the Block) is a reality aftershow and spin-off of Big Brother hosted by Ross Mathews and Marissa Jaret Winokur who were both HouseGuests on the first season of Celebrity Big Brother. The show premiered on June 29, 2018 as a Facebook Watch exclusive. The series did not return as a companion to Big Brother 21.

Development
The first aftershow attempted by CBS began in 2004 with House Calls: The Big Brother Talk Show The series primarily featured a discussion about events occurring in the Big Brother house. House Calls aired every weekday alongside new episodes of Big Brother from Big Brother 5 until its cancellation prior to Big Brother 11 in 2008. The next companion show began in 2012 with former Big Brother HouseGuest Jeff Schroeder known as Big Brother: Live Chat. The show aired each week following the live eviction when Schroeder would interview the evicted HouseGuests. However, On August 10, 2017 Schroeder announced that he was moving to Colorado and would no longer be able to host the show. Ahead of Big Brother 20 it was announced by Julie Chen on Twitter that Celebrity Big Brother 1 runner-up and winner Ross Mathews and Marissa Jaret Winokur would be filling in the gap left by Schroeder with a new show called Off the Block.

Production
Due to the format of Big Brother, beginning with episode 7, the hosts are required to keep certain aspects of the parent series confidential from the evicted HouseGuest in an effort to keep their Jury vote unbiased.

Broadcast
The show airs on Fridays the day after live eviction episodes of Big Brother 20 and is a Facebook Watch exclusive. The first-season finale is set to air live immediately following the Big Brother 20 finale from the House's backyard featuring interviews from the season's HouseGuests.

Format
Each episode generally consists of the following format in order:
BB Breakdown: Ross and Marissa discuss the biggest moments from the recent episodes of Big Brother.
Live Feed Exclusive: An exclusive highlight from the Big Brother Live Feeds that is only shown on Off the Block.
Off the Block Interview: Ross and Marissa interview the most recently evicted HouseGuests.
Prediction Predicament: Ross and Marissa make their own predictions based on what is currently happening inside the Big Brother house.

Episodes

Notes

References

External links
 

2018 American television series debuts
2018 American television series endings
2010s American reality television series
Aftershows
American television spin-offs
Big Brother (American TV series)
Reality television spin-offs
Television series about television